Bua Ngam  is a tambon (subdistrict) located in the central region of Buntharik district, in Ubon Ratchathani Province, Thailand. In 2021, it had a population of 10,374 people. Neighbouring subdistricts are (clockwise from the south) Huai Kha, Non Kho, Nong Sano, and Phon Ngam.

History
The area was first settled by several groups of villagers evacuated from Sisaket, Amnat Charoen, Det Udom, and Phibun Mangsahan, but the exact timing is unknown. It was also one of the battlefields between the Government of Thailand and the Communist Party of Thailand in a guerrilla war lasting from 1965 until 1983.

The subdistrict of Bua Ngam was founded in 1985 by splitting off seven villages in the western area of the Phon Ngam subdistrict.

Geography
The tambon is located in the central region of the Buntharik district, on the low river plains of the Lam Dom Noi River (ลำโดมน้อย).

Administration
The subdistrict of Bua Ngam is divided into 12 administrative villages (mubans; หมู่บ้าน), three of which, Non Bak, Udon Chroen, and Taksin Pattana, were further divided into two community groups (Mu; หมู่). The area is shared by 2 local governments; the township area on the west bank of the Lam Dom Noi was administrated by the Buntharik Subdistrict Municipality (เทศบาลตำบลบุณฑริก), which also covered some area of the neighboring subdistrict, Phon Ngam,  while the remaining, approximately 44 km2, was covered by the Subdistrict Administrative Organization of Bua Ngam (องค์การบริหารส่วนตำบลบัวงาม; Bua Ngam SAO).

As of the 2021 census, it had a population of 10,374 people with 3,923 households. The following is a list of the subdistrict's mubans, which roughly correspond to the villages.

References

Tambon of Ubon Ratchathani Province